Nenad Radosavljević (born 31 March 1961) is a Kosovo Serb politician, administrator, and media owner. He was a prominent community figure during the early years of the United Nations Interim Administration Mission in Kosovo (UNMIK) mandate and remains active in the Kosovo Serb community today.

Early life and career
Before entering political life, Radosavljević was director of the ironworks factory in Lešak, Leposavić, and director general of the tools factory in Zvečan.

Politician and administrator

Mayor and parliamentarian
Radosavljević was the leader of the Leposavić branch of the Serbian National Council (Srpsko nacionalno Veće, SNV) in 2000. He owned a radio station in northern Kosovo during this time, was active with the New Democracy (Nova demokratija, ND) party, and was a prominent local opponent of Slobodan Milošević's administration. 

In the aftermath of the Kosovo War (1998–99), relations in the province between the majority Albanian community and the minority Serb community were generally poor. The Organization for Security and Co-operation in Europe (OSCE) organized a census in Kosovo in 2000 as a prelude to local elections later in the same year. The organization's activities were largely boycotted by the Serb community in the northern part of the province; unlike other community leaders, Radosavljević was open to the prospect of co-operation with OSCE and participation in the ballot. His position met with strong opposition, with some arguing that any poll would be premature before the security situation improved and Serb refugees could return to province. On one occasion, a registration drive in Leposavić that had been approved by Radosavljević was shut down by community activists from Mitrovica. 

Radosavljević attended talks in Washington, D.C., in July 2000 as a representative of the SNV. The talks did not deal with the status of Kosovo but rather with ending the ongoing violence between Serb and Albanian communities and creating the conditions for the development of democratic institutions in the area.

New Democracy participated in the Democratic Opposition of Serbia (Demokratska opozicija Srbije, DOS) in the 2000 Yugoslavian general election, and Radosavljević campaigned with DOS presidential candidate Vojislav Koštunica in Leposavić. Koštunica defeated Slobodan Milošević in the election, an event that precipitated widespread changes in the political life of Serbia and Yugoslavia.

The Serb community generally boycotted the 2000 local elections in Kosovo. Radosavljević was appointed as mayor of Leposavić in 2001 under the auspices of UNMIK.

Radosavljević was elected to the Assembly of Kosovo as a candidate of the Serb community's "Return" coalition in the 2001 Kosovan parliamentary election, which was held under the auspices of UNMIK. Soon after the election, he complained that Serb politicians were largely being ignored in the assembly, against the backdrop of ongoing conflicts within the province's Albanian parties.

UNMIK representative
In May 2002, Radosavljević was appointed as a senior advisor to UNMIK leader Michael Steiner on the nomination of the Return coalition, with responsibility for returns (i.e., of displaced persons) and communities. In this capacity, he encouraged Serbs to participate in the 2002 Kosovan local elections. After the poor performance of the Return group in the election, Radosavljević remarked that the coalition was approaching its logical end.

He opposed an assembly boycott called by Serb MPs in 2002, saying, "It is not courageous if Serb deputies leave the Kosovo parliament and run away from it. the courageous thing to do is to fight regardless of the difficult position in which Return Coalition deputies have been working since the very beginning." He added that Serb MPs in the assembly had done creditable work in fighting to ensure freedom of movement, safety, and the return of Serb property throughout the province.

In the aftermath of the March 2004 unrest in Kosovo, Radosavljević said that attempts to reconstruct Serb homes in Svinjare were being hindered by extremist elements in the Albanian community, who were dismantling newly restored homes on an almost nightly basis. He later argued that the return of Serbs to Svinjare was a matter of particular importance for his community. He refused to sign a declaration to create a Kosovo ministry for the rights of communities, human rights, and return issues during this period, arguing that such a ministry would simply give the province's Albanian leadership increased rights without increased responsibility. He described the ministry's eventual creation as "an attempt by UNMIK to avoid the responsibility for not working and having bad results."

In October 2004, Radosavljević expressed concern that Serbs in Kosovo were being offered large sums of money to sell their homes, as part of a deliberate strategy of reducing the community's numbers in the province.

He resigned from his position on 26 January 2005, saying, "there is neither ethical nor political reason for me to create an illusion of well-being in the post of a high advisor, and to, without a possibility to prevent it, watch the further cleansing of my people instead of their return."

Since 2005
The Government of Serbia established a Council for Kosovo-Metohija in February 2005, with Radosavljević as one of its members. Two months later, he was one of six SNV delegates who participated in a meeting with Serbian prime minister Koštunica.

New Democracy was renamed as the Liberals of Serbia (Liberali Srbije, LS) in 2003. The party contested the 2007 Serbian parliamentary election on the electoral list of the Serbian Renewal Movement (Srpski pokret obnove, SPO); Radosavljević was included on the list, which did not cross the electoral threshold to win representation in the assembly.

In October 2007, Radosavljević walked out of a round-table discussion on the status of Kosovo organized by the United States of America-based Project on Ethnic Relations, on the grounds that the views of Serb participants were being ignored. 

The Liberals of Serbia initially planned to participate in the 2007 Kosovan parliamentary election but ultimately decided against doing so. Radosavljević explained that the party's change in strategy was due to the Serbian government's call for a boycott. He was quoted as saying, "a clash of interests between the state and Serbs in the region would undoubtedly be detrimental to the Kosovo people. Without state support, without stronger Serbian institutions in the province, it is unlikely the Serbs could have survived." He later said, however, that the boycott was a mistake; had the Serbs voted, he said, "they would have had their legitimate representatives and there would be no problem as to who is or is not legitimate."

Radosavljević ran for mayor of Leposavić in the 2013 local elections as the candidate of his own "People's Justice" movement. He was defeated, finishing in fourth place. "People's Justice" won a seat on the municipal assembly, which automatically went to Radosavljević as the list's leader. In September 2014, however, he said that he and three other elected delegates had never received invitations to the assembly, which was therefore improperly constituted. He ran for mayor again in the 2017 local elections and finished a distant third; on this occasion, his list did not win any assembly mandates.

Radosavljević is now the owner of TV Mir in Leposavić. He is a vocal opponent of Serbian president Aleksandar Vučić, whom he has described as operating a dictatorial regime. In 2021, he rejected the suggestion that health and education services in northern Kosovo's Serb communities could be integrated into Kosovo's system. "Health and education must remain an integral part of the Serbian system even now," he said.

Electoral record

Local

Notes

References

1961 births
Living people
Kosovo Serbs
People from Leposavić
Mayors of places in Serbia
Mayors of places in Kosovo
Members of the Assembly of Kosovo (UNMIK mandate until 2008)
Liberals of Serbia politicians